Urlín Bautista Cangá Quinteros (born 29 August 1959) is an Ecuadorian footballer. He played in two matches for the Ecuador national football team in 1987. He was also part of Ecuador's squad for the 1987 Copa América tournament.

References

1959 births
Living people
Ecuadorian footballers
Ecuador international footballers
Association football defenders
Sportspeople from Guayaquil